Cowboys and Indians may refer to:

"Cowboys and Indians", various children's games, similar to Cops and robbers

Films
 Cowboys and Indians (film), 2007 American short film
 The Cowboy and the Indians, a 1949 American Western film directed by John English
 Cowboys & Indians: The Killing of J.J. Harper, a 2003 television movie about the killing of John Joseph Harper

Music

Albums 
 Cowboys and Indians (album), a 2003 album by The Jeevas
 Cowboys and Indians, a 1965 album by The New Christy Minstrels

Songs 
 "Cowboys & Indians", a song by The Cross from the album Shove It
 "Cowboy and Indian", a song by Susumu Hirasawa from the album The Ghost in Science
 "Cowboys & Indians", a song by Nik Kershaw from the album The Works
 "Cowboys and Indians", several tracks by M from the album New York–London–Paris–Munich

Printed media
 Cowboys & Indians (magazine), an American magazine for adults that focuses on the Western lifestyle
 Cowboys & Indians: The Killing of J.J. Harper, a 1999 book by Gordon Sinclair Jr. about the killing of John Joseph Harper
 Cowboys and East Indians, a 2015 novel

See also
 All Indian Rodeo Cowboys Association, a Native American organization which promotes Indian rodeo
 American Indian Wars
 Cowboy (disambiguation)
 Indian (disambiguation)
 Western (genre)